David Connor may refer to:

 David Conner (naval officer) (1792–1856), officer of the United States Navy
 David Connor (footballer) (born 1945), English football defender
 David Connor (sailor) (born 1962), Australian Olympic sailor
List of Damages characters#David Connor

See also
David Conner (disambiguation)
David O'Connor (disambiguation)